MS Koum Hamada, also known as Koum Hamada Youth Center, or simply Koum Hamada YC, is an Egyptian football club based in Koum Hamada, El Beheira, Egypt. The club currently plays in the Egyptian Second Division, the second-highest league in the Egyptian football league system.

Egyptian Second Division
Football clubs in Egypt